The Colombia national beach soccer team represents Colombia in international beach soccer competitions and is controlled by the Federación Colombiana de Fútbol (FCF), the governing body for football in Colombia.

Colombia entered the international beach soccer scene in 2009 at the first edition of the South American Beach Games. The team subsequently debuted in the largest beach soccer event in South America, the World Cup qualifiers, in 2011, finishing in 4th place – their best finish in any major competition to date. Since then, Colombia have remained an active team, becoming regulars at the major CONMEBOL events of the World Cup qualifiers, Copa América and Liga Sudamericana, however have yet to achieve a podium finish.

Current squad
As of March 2018

Coach: Santiago Alzate

Achievements
 CONMEBOL qualifiers for the FIFA Beach Soccer World Cup best: 4th place
 2011
 Copa América de Beach Soccer best: 8th place
 2016
 South American Beach Games best: 4th place
 2009

Competitive record

FIFA Beach Soccer World Cup

Copa América de Beach Soccer

CONMEBOL qualifiers for the FIFA Beach Soccer World Cup

 – Note: 2005 and 2007 were held in a joint championship with CONCACAF

South American Beach Games

Central American and Caribbean Beach Games

See also
 Colombia national futsal team

References

External links
 Colombia Profile, at Beach Soccer Worldwide
 Colombia, at Beach Soccer Russia (in Russian)
 List of results – '09, '11, '12, '13, '14, '15, '16, '17, '18

South American national beach soccer teams
Beach Soccer